Hernando Courtright (1904–1986) was an American businessman best known as a hotelier. At different points, he was the proprietor of the Beverly Hills Hotel and The Beverly Wilshire Hotel. Courtright became one of the youngest vice presidents for the Bank of America in San Francisco during the 1930s, and when the Beverly Hills Hotel went into bankruptcy, he was assigned to the foreclosure. Having been a banker managing the foreclosed Beverly Hills Hotel, he formed a real estate investment group and personally managed the property. Under his management, it became among the best-known and admired American hotels. Before his death, he sold The Beverly Wilshire Hotel  to a Hong Kong investment group.

Courtright was credited with naming the Polo Lounge, having been inspired during renovations to the Beverly Hills Hotel bar, displaying a trophy won by a friend who led a national champion polo team.

In 1956, Courtright sold the Beverly Hills Hotel to Ben L. Silberstein for $5.5 million. In the deal, the plan was for Courtright, who knew the social groups of Los Angeles and other owners at the time, to stay on for five years as president and general manager.

References

1986 deaths
American hoteliers
American real estate businesspeople
American socialites
1904 births
University of California, Berkeley alumni
University of Southern California alumni